Clement Sidney Hill (February 13, 1813 – January 5, 1892) was a United States representative from Kentucky. He was born near Lebanon, Kentucky. He pursued academic studies and attended St. Mary's College, St. Mary, Kentucky. Later, he studied law. Hill was admitted to the bar in 1837 and commenced practice in Lebanon, Kentucky.

Hill was a member of the Kentucky House of Representatives in 1839. He was elected as a Whig to the Thirty-third Congress (1853–1855). After leaving Congress, he resumed the practice of law in Lebanon, Kentucky where he died in 1892. He was buried in St. Augustine's Cemetery.

References

1813 births
1892 deaths
Members of the Kentucky House of Representatives
Whig Party members of the United States House of Representatives from Kentucky
People from Marion County, Kentucky
19th-century American politicians